Midwest Pandemic is Twelve Tribes's third and final full-length album. They continue to follow the same style as their previous albums by using different or complex time signatures instead of common time.

Track listing
"National Amnesia" – 1:54
"Muzzle Order" - 3:34
"Televangelist" - 2:36
"Pagan Self Portrait" - 4:12
"History Versus The Pavement" - 3:30
"Monarch Of Dreams" - 2:11
"Librium" - 3:54
"Verona" - 2:53
"The Nine Year Tide" - 5:46
"Midwest Pandemic" - 4:10
"The Recovery (In Three Parts) I. God Bless You, Good Thief, II. Towers & Vectors, III. Bridge To The Sun" - 8:51

Videos
A music video was produced for the track "Muzzle Order".

Credits
Adam Jackson - vocals  
Andrew Corpus - guitar
Kevin Schindel - guitar
Matt Tackett - bass guitar
Shane Shook  - drums

2006 albums
Twelve Tribes (band) albums